Biathlon at the 1992 Winter Paralympics consisted of four events for men.

Medal table

Medal summary 
The competition event was:
7.5 km: men

The event had separate standing, or visually impaired classifications:

LW2 - standing: single leg amputation above the knee
LW4 - standing: single leg amputation below the knee
LW6/8 - standing: single arm amputation
B1 - visually impaired: no functional vision
B2 - visually impaired: up to ca 3-5% functional vision
B3 - visually impaired: under 10% functional vision

See also
Biathlon at the 1992 Winter Olympics

References 

 

 Winter Sport Classification, Canadian Paralympic Committee

1992 Winter Paralympics events
1992
Paralympics
Biathlon competitions in France